Russell Elevado (born 1966 in the Philippines) is a recording engineer and record producer based in New York City.

Accolades 
Russell Elevado has a catalog of 50 full albums from the over 100 albums in his discography.

Elevado earned a Grammy Award in 2000 for his work recording and mixing contemporary R&B recording artist D'Angelo's critically acclaimed album Voodoo. Voodoo is now considered a classic album in the contemporary R&B genre and paved the way for the neo soul movement. Elevado's "old school" engineering techniques and preference for using mostly vintage equipment gave the album a sound reminiscent of classic soul or funk records fused with hip-hop textures and psychedelic treatments heard on classic 1960s and 1970s rock records.

In 2009, he received a Grammy nomination for Best Engineered Album for engineering Al Green's Lay It Down. 

In 2015, he won another Grammy for Best R&B Album as engineer/mixer on D'Angelo's Black Messiah, the long-awaited follow-up to Voodoo. 

In 2020 Elevado won a third Grammy in the Best World Music category for mixing Angelique Kidjo's "Celia" album. in the same year he also received a nomination as producer/engineer/mixer for the band Lettuce in the Best Jazz instrumental album category.

Elevado mixed a few songs for Bilal's controversially unreleased second album, Love for Sale.

His work with Questlove, The Roots and Common is also very notable, pushing the limits of organic hip hop with creative mixing. he's worked with some of the most popular and influential artists and producers of his era like Alicia Keys (Elevado mixed her hugely successful debut single “Fallen”), Jay Z, Rick Rubin, Tony Visconti, Roy Hargrove, Mark Ronson, Erykah Badu and J Dilla to name a few. What sets him apart from his peers is his commitment to analog. He has been quoted in many interviews about his dissatisfaction with the digital recording medium and the way it has changed the industry and the creative process of artists and production. Elevado does not use any plug-ins (digital effects and processing) and uses analog equipment exclusively for processing. His dedication to analog has defined his career attracting a wide range of artists from different genres.

Selected discography
Full albums mixed
Angélique Kidjo - "OYO"
Blackalicious - “Blazing Arrow”
Blackalicious - “The Craft”
Corneille - “Birth of Cornelius”
D'Angelo - “Voodoo” (engineered and mixed)
D'Angelo- "Black Messiah"
Dave Chappelle’s Block Party - Soundtrack w/ various artists
David Ward - “Violet, Gold + Rose” (mixed and mastered)
Dornik- "Dornik"
Fredy Massamba - "Makasi"
Goapele - “Change It All”
iET - "So Unreal"
Inky - "Primal Swag"
Jay-Z Feat. The Roots - “MTV Unplugged”
Kamasi Washington- "Truth"
Karl Denson - “The Bridge”
Keziah Jones - “Black Orpheus”
Keziah Jones - "Captain Rugged"
Mike Andersen - "Echoes"
Nikka Costa - "Everybody's Got Their Something”
Nikka Costa - "Pebble to a Pearl"
Patrice - “Nile”
Patrice - "One"
Roy Hargrove presents The RH Factor - “Hard Groove” (Co-produced, engineered and mixed)
Roy Hargrove presents The RH Factor - “Strength” (Co-produced, engineered and mixed)
Roy Hargrove presents The RH Factor - “Distractions” (Co-produced, engineered and mixed)
Saul Williams - “Amethyst Rock Star”
The Dandy Warhols - The Dandy Warhols Are Sound
Tye Tribbett & G.A -  “Life”
Today - "The New Formula" "I Got the Feeling" (Engineered)
Wayna - "The Expats"
Zap Mama - "ReCreation"(mixed)

References

External links
/ Full discography
Personal website
Video

1966 births
American audio engineers
Grammy Award winners
Living people
American people of Filipino descent